) is a surname of Swedish American origin. Notable people with the surname include:

Hugo Leander Blomquist (1885–1964), botanist
Edwin W. Blomquist (1896–1963), American politician
Kathleen Blomquist, United States Government official
Michael Blomquist (born 1981), American rower and a former World Champion
Rich Blomquist, staff writer for The Daily Show

See also
Blomqvist
Bloomquist

Swedish-language surnames